The 1998 AFL Women's National Championships took place in Melbourne, Victoria, Australia. The tournament began on 19 June and ended on 24 June 1998. The 1998 tournament was the 7th Championship. The Senior-vics of Victoria won the 1998 Championship, defeating Western Australia in the final. It was Victoria's 8th consecutive title.

Ladder
  Victoria-Senior
  Western Australia
  Queensland
  Australian Capital Territory
  Northern Territory
  Australian Capital Territory
  South Australia
  New South Wales

All-Australian Team

Jessica Morris (1st Ruck)

Wendy Jeffries (wing)

External links
National Results from the AFL site

1998
1998 in Australian rules football
AFL